Live in Seoul may refer to:

Albums
Live in Seoul, by Metallica 2006 DVD
Live in Seoul, by Placido Domingo 1997
Live in Seoul, by Isao Sasaki 2014 
Live in Seoul, by Dream Theater 2000
Live in Seoul, by Avril Lavigne 2004 DVD
Live in Seoul, by Journey (band),  2005 DVD